Allergic to Water is the 18th studio album by singer-songwriter Ani DiFranco, released on November 4, 2014.

Critical reception

The album has a score of 71 out of 100 from Metacritic based on "generally favorable reviews".

Commercial performance
The album debuted at No. 155 on the Billboard 200.

Track listing

Personnel
Adapted from the album credits.
Ani DiFranco – guitar, tamburitza, wurli, harpsichord, xylophone, vocals
Todd Sickafoose – bass, piano, Bilhorn organ, synthesizer, wurli, bells, orchestron
Terence Higgins – drums, percussion
Ivan Neville – wurli, clavinet, piano
Jenny Scheinman – violins, backing vocals
Mike Dillon – triangle
Matt Perrine – sousaphone

Production
Recorded by Mike Napolitano – recording
Andy Taub – recording
Todd Sickafoose  – recording
Ani DiFranco  – producer, mixing, recording
Brent Lambert– mastering
Brian Grunert – art direction
Charles Waldorf – portraits

References

External links
Record labels album page

2014 albums
Ani DiFranco albums
Righteous Babe Records albums